Giovanni Costanzi (1674–1754) was an Italian gem engraver of the late-Baroque period. 

He was the head of a family of gem-makers and artists in Naples. His sons Carlo and Tommaso were also a gem engravers, while his other son Placido became a painter. Giovanni later moved and worked the rest of his life in Rome. One of his commissions was for Frederick the Great.

References

1674 births
1754 deaths
Artists from Naples
18th-century Italian artists
Engraved gem artists